Marcus Argentarius (fl. ) was a Greek epigrammatist. 

Some thirty-seven epigrams are attributed to Marcus in the Greek Anthology, most of which are erotic, and some are plays on words. Stylistic evidence suggests he wrote during the early days of the Roman Empire, certainly not later than the middle of the first century AD, and his received epithet (argentarius, "money changer") supports a commercial Roman connection, but nothing more is known of his age.

Bibliography
Anthol. Graec. XIII. pp. 860–861.
London: Heinemann, 1916–18.
Higham, T. F. and C. M. Bowra (eds.) The Oxford Book of Greek Verse in Translation. Oxford: Oxford University Press, 1938.
Smith, William (ed.) "M. Argentarius". Dictionary of Greek and Roman Biography and Mythology, Vol. III, 1870.

References

External links
 Smith, Andrew (ed.) "Marcus Argentarius: Epigrams" 
Hendry, Michael, "Argentarius Once More" 

Epigrammatists of the Greek Anthology
Ancient Greek erotic poets
Ancient Roman poets
Year of death unknown
Year of birth unknown